Robert Peters (born 1961) is an American character actor and director.

Peters was born on July 20, 1961 in Tulsa, Oklahoma and graduated from Edison High School and the University of Oklahoma. His grandfather helped establish Alcoholics Anonymous in Oklahoma. As a teenager, Peters appeared at the Tulsa Little Theater. He is now a resident of both Oklahoma and California, and tries to shoot films in Oklahoma when possible.  

He has appeared in numerous films and television shows and commercials. His film credits include In the Line of Fire (1993), Ocean's Eleven (2002) and Lincoln (2012). The first feature film he directed was Half Empty, a musical comedy from 2006. He has appeared in at least 46 productions since 1988. Among the films shot in Oklahoma in which he appeared were Eye of God, the cockfighting film The Round and Round and the baseball movie Home Run (2013).

Filmography

Red Shoe Diaries (1992-1997), television series, two episodes
Without Warning  (1994)
Open House  (2004)
The Last Run  (2004)
Bright Falls (2010), Alan Wake prequel mini-series
Welcome to the Jungle (2013)
Grand-Daddy Day Care (2019)

References

External links
Interview with Peters in OHS Extra!, newsletter of the Oklahoma Historical Society, November 20, 2012, part 1, part 2, and part 3, via Oklahoma Digital Prairie. 

1961 births
20th-century American male actors
21st-century American male actors
American directors
Male actors from Oklahoma
Living people